Joyce Ludovick Kinabo (born 1955, as Joyce Chisawilo) is a Tanzanian academic professor and researcher. She works at Sokoine University of Agriculture (SUA) in Morogoro, Tanzania, in the Department of Food Technology, where she researches and teaches various aspects of nutritional science.

Education and honors 
Kinabo was born on 22 July 1955 to David Peter Chisawilo and Ekilia David Chitungo-Chisawilo in the Mpwapwa, Dodoma region, Tanzania.

When she graduated from high school, Joyce was selected to attend the Kilakala Girls High School in 1975 and after graduating performed her compulsory year of public service. In 1980, she obtain her bachelor's degree in agriculture with a major in Food Science and Technology from University of Dar es Salaam. She went to work at the Tanzania Food and Nutrition Center.

By 1984 she had earned a Master of Science degree in food science from University of Leeds in England and in 1990 received her Doctor of Science in Nutritional Physiology from University of Glasgow. Scotland.

See also

References

External links 

 
 Not enough is being done to combat malnutrition (Ben Hewitt, Al-Jazeera Opinion, May 8, 2012)

Living people
Tanzanian women
Tanzanian scientists
Tanzanian women scientists
Alumni of the University of Leeds
University of Dar es Salaam alumni
Alumni of the University of Glasgow
Academic staff of Sokoine University of Agriculture
1955 births